The Fish Haul Archaeological Site, an "address restricted" site located in Beaufort County, South Carolina, is significant because of its archaeological remains from two different eras.  The pre-historic findings, which date from 1800 to 1300 BC, offer evidence that small groups of people lived in the area. The historic component represents a freemen's village, Mitchelville, which was occupied during the transition between slavery and freedom by Sea Island blacks. The Fish Haul site represents the only known freedmen village established by occupying Union troops. The site was listed in the National Register of Historic Places on June 30, 1988.

References

Archaeological sites on the National Register of Historic Places in South Carolina
Geography of Beaufort County, South Carolina
National Register of Historic Places in Beaufort County, South Carolina